James Salmon (8 January 1849 – 28 November 1903) was a New Zealand cricketer. He played in four first-class matches for Wellington from 1873 to 1881.

Salmon was a right-arm medium-pace bowler. The 1877-78 Australian team considered him Wellington's best bowler. 

He worked in Wellington as managing clerk for Chapman & Tripp, barristers, until obliged to give up work in 1901 owing to illness. In November 1903 he died suddenly at home in Wellington of heart failure after a fall. He left two sons and a daughter.

See also
 List of Wellington representative cricketers

References

External links
 

1849 births
1903 deaths
New Zealand cricketers
Wellington cricketers
Cricketers from Sydney